Mount Taylor National Forest was established as the Mount Taylor Forest Reserve by the U.S. Forest Service in New Mexico on October 5, 1906 with . It became a National Forest on March 4, 1907. On April 16, 1908 Mount Taylor was combined with Manzano National Forest. 

The Mount Taylor Forest is part of the Mount Taylor Ranger District of Cibola National Forest, in the San Mateo Mountains to the northeast of Grants

References

External links
Cibola National Forest, Mount Taylor Ranger District
Forest History Society
Listing of the National Forests of the United States and Their Dates (from the Forest History Society website) Text from Davis, Richard C., ed. Encyclopedia of American Forest and Conservation History. New York: Macmillan Publishing Company for the Forest History Society, 1983. Vol. II, pp. 743-788.

Former National Forests of New Mexico
Protected areas of Cibola County, New Mexico
Protected areas of McKinley County, New Mexico
Protected areas of Sandoval County, New Mexico